Banian may refer to:
 Bania (caste)
 Banian Hospital
 Banian, Khyber Pakhtunkhwa, Pakistan
 Banian, Guinea
 Banian, Iran (disambiguation)
 Banyan (clothing)
 Banyan merchants
 Banyan tree
 Baniyan, an undershirt or vest, primarily an Indian expression in Hindi and Malayalam languages; the traditional wear for fishermen in Kerala

See also
 Bania (disambiguation)
 Banyan (disambiguation)